Alik may refer to:

People
Given name
Alik Arakelyan (born 1996), Armenian footballer
Alik Cavaliere (1926–1998), Italian sculptor
Alik Gershon (born 1980), Ukraine-born Israeli chess grandmaster
Alik Gunashian or Gyunashyan (born 1955), Armenian singer
Alik Haýdarow (born 1981), Turkmenistan footballer
Alik Magin, Australian rules footballer
Alik Sakharov (born 1959), American film and television director and cinematographer

Surname
Alik Alik (born 1953), diplomat and politician from the Federated States of Micronesia
Daisy Alik-Momotaro, Marshallese politician
SA Haque Alik, Bangladeshi film director, screenwriter and composer

Media
Alik (daily), Armenian Iranian daily newspaper

See also
Əlik, a village and municipality in the Quba Rayon of Azerbaijan
Alik Sukh, English title Unreal Happiness, 2013 Indian Bengali thriller film